Jamie Rivers (born March 16, 1975) is a Canadian professional ice hockey coach, executive and former player. Rivers was most recently the head coach and General Manager of the Central Hockey League's St. Charles Chill.  Rivers played 454 games in the National Hockey League (NHL). He last played in Europe for KHL Medveščak. He is Huron First Nations.

Playing career

Rivers was drafted in the third round, 63rd overall by the St. Louis Blues in the 1993 NHL Entry Draft. Jamie Rivers also has a brother, Shawn, who played for the Tampa Bay Lightning.  He has represented Canada at the 2009 Spengler Cup.

On November 19, 2009, Rivers returned to Europe after a season in the American Hockey League with the Chicago Wolves to join HC Ambri-Piotta of the Swiss National League A.

In the succeeding 2010–11 season, Rivers remained in Europe and following a trial signed with KHL Medveščak, at the time a member of the Austrian Hockey League, on December 16, 2010. During his 14th game with Medveščak, Rivers suffered a ruptured spleen after completing a check. After initially going undiagnosed, a few days later Rivers was rushed to hospital and underwent emergency surgery. Suffering a large amount of internal bleeding, Rivers' heart stopped before he was electronically defibrillated back to life. Rivers was ruled out for the remainder of the season and returned to St. Louis, where he now lives with his wife Shannon, 22-year-old daughter Karson, 19-year-old twin boys Ashton and Braydon, and 14-year-old McKinnon.

Coaching
On September 17, 2012, Rivers was named head coach of the St. Charles Chill of the Central Hockey League.

Career statistics

Regular season and playoffs

International

Awards and honours

References

External links

1975 births
Boston Bruins players
Canadian ice hockey coaches
Canadian ice hockey defencemen
Central Hockey League coaches
Chicago Wolves players
Detroit Red Wings players
Florida Panthers players
Grand Rapids Griffins players
Grand Rapids Griffins (IHL) players
HC Ambrì-Piotta players
HC Spartak Moscow players
Hershey Bears players
Ice hockey people from Ottawa
KHL Medveščak Zagreb players
Living people
New York Islanders players
Ottawa Senators players
Peoria Rivermen (AHL) players
Phoenix Coyotes players
St. Louis Blues draft picks
St. Louis Blues players
San Antonio Rampage players
Sudbury Wolves players
Worcester IceCats players
First Nations sportspeople
Canadian expatriate ice hockey players in Croatia
Canadian expatriate ice hockey players in Russia
Canadian expatriate ice hockey players in Switzerland